Nguyễn Văn Quyết (born 1 July 1991) is a Vietnamese professional footballer who plays  as a forward for V.League 1 club Hà Nội and the Vietnam national team.

Quyết started his career with Thể Công before moving to V.League 1 side Hanoi FC in 2011, where he established himself as one of the best player in the league. He won thirteenth trophies at Hanoi, including five V.League 1 titles, three Vietnamese Cup and five Vietnamese Super Cup.

Quyết is a former Vietnam youth international, representing his country at under-19, under-21 and under-23 levels. He made his debut for Vietnam senior team in 2011 and was part of the national team that won the 2018 AFF Championship.

Career statistics

Club

International

International goals
Scores and results list Vietnam's goal tally first, score column indicates score after each Quyết goal.

Hanoi FC

U-23/Olympic

Honours
Hanoi
V.League 1: 2013, 2016, 2018, 2019, 2022
Vietnamese National Cup: 2019, 2020, 2022
Vietnamese Super Cup: 2010, 2019, 2020, 2021, 2022

Vietnam U23/Olympic
Asian Games Fourth place: 2018
VFF Cup: 2018

Vietnam
AFF Championship: 2018; runner-up: 2022
AYA Bank Cup: 2016
VFF Cup: 2022

Individual
Vietnamese Young Player of the Year: 2010, 2011
Vietnamese Silver Ball: 2014, 2015
Vietnamese Golden Ball: 2020, 2022
V.League 1 Player of the Season: 2018, 2020, 2022
V.League 1 Team of the Season: 2011, 2014, 2015, 2018, 2019, 2022
Top 10 outstanding Vietnamese athletes of the Year: 2020 (Top 1)
 2022 VFF Tri-Nations Series top scorer

Controversy
On 13 March 2016, in a match against Sanna Khánh Hòa Quyết was sent off after pushing over the referee who had just made a controversial call.

References

External links

1991 births
Living people
Sportspeople from Hanoi
Association football wingers
Vietnamese footballers
V.League 1 players
Hanoi FC players
V.League 2 players
Viettel FC players
Vietnam youth international footballers
Vietnam international footballers
Footballers at the 2018 Asian Games
Asian Games competitors for Vietnam